Eugenia Livanos-Niarchos  (1927 – 4 May 1970) was the third wife of Stavros Niarchos.

She was the daughter of shipping magnate Stavros G. Livanos and his wife Arietta Zafirakis. Her sister was Athina Livanos, the wife successively of Aristotle Onassis and Stavros Niarchos. In 1947 she married Stavros Niarchos. The couple had four children, Philip, Spyros, Konstantinos and Maria.

On 4 May 1970, she was found dead at home on the Niarchos family's private island Spetsopoula, having died from an overdose of barbiturates. An inquiry into the circumstances of her death exonerated her husband.

She is buried in the family tomb of the Niarchos family.

References

1927 births
1970 deaths
Greek socialites
Livanos family
Niarchos family
Drug-related deaths in Greece
Barbiturates-related deaths